Alexander Boyd Baird (August 31, 1891 – November 23, 1967) was a Canadian businessman and Senator.

Born in St. John's, Newfoundland Colony, he was summoned to the Canadian Senate in 1949 and represented the senatorial division of St. John's, Newfoundland and Labrador. A Liberal, he served until he died in 1967.

Baird served as a Major in the Royal Newfoundland Regiment during World War I from 1914 to 1918.

See also
 List of Newfoundland and Labrador senators

References

1891 births
1967 deaths
Canadian senators from Newfoundland and Labrador
Liberal Party of Canada senators
Politicians from St. John's, Newfoundland and Labrador
Newfoundland military personnel of World War I
Royal Newfoundland Regiment officers
Dominion of Newfoundland people